Iris was launched at Liverpool as a slaver. In all she made eight voyages (1783-1800) carrying slaves from West Africa to the Caribbean. She also made one voyage for the British East India Company (EIC) to Bengal and back (1795-1796). She was condemned in Jamaica in December 1800 as unseaworthy.

Career
Iris entered Lloyd's Register in 1783 with Kirvinton, master, Backhouse, owner, and trade Liverpool–Africa.

Enslaving voyage #1 (1783-1785): Captain Thomas Holliday sailed from Liverpool on 16 November 1783 bound for the Gold Coast with a crew of 51. Iris started gathering her captives on 6 February 1784 at Cape Coast Castle. She sailed from Africa on 28 August and arrived at Jamaica on 30 October. She had embarked 500 captives and she disembarked 448, for a loss rate of 10.4%. On 17 December Iris sailed from Jamaica; she arrived back at Liverpool on 3 February 1785.

Enslaving voyage #2 (1787-1789): Captain Peter Potter sailed from Liverpool on 20 March 1787, bound for the Bight of Biafra and Gulf of Guinea islands. Iris gathered her captives at Calabar and arrived at Montego Bay on 5 September 1788. She had embarked 423 captives and disembarked 362, for a loss rate of 8.4%. She had left Liverpool with 42 crew members and had lost 10 on the voyage. Iris left Jamaica on 24 November, and arrived at Liverpool on 5 February 1789.

Enslaving voyage #3 (1790-1791): Captain George Greaves sailed from Liverpool on 12 April 1790, bound for the Bight of Biafra. Iris arrived at Montego Bay on 26 November 1790. She had embarked 438 captives and landed 401, for a loss rate of 8.4%. She had a crew of 31, of whom seven died. Iris left Jamaica on 21 January 1791 and arrived at Liverpool on 18 March 1791.

Enslaving voyage #4 (1791-1792): Captain Greaves sailed from Liverpool on 26 June 1791, bound for the Bight of Biafra. She arrived at Africa on 24 August 1791 and gathered her captives at Bonny Island. She left Africa on 5 January 1792 and arrived at Jamaica on 28 February 92. She had embarked 350 captives and landed 345, for a loss rate of 1.4%. She had a crew of 30 men, three of whom died on the voyage. Iris arrived back at Liverpool on 3 June 1792.

After the passage of Dolben's Act, masters received a bonus of £100 for a mortality rate of under 2%; the ship's surgeon received £50. For a mortality rate between two and three percent, the bonus was halved. There was no bonus if mortality exceeded 3%. 

Enslaving voyage #5 (1792-1793): Captain Thomas Huson sailed from Liverpool on 8 July 1792, bound for the Gold Coast. Iris started gathering her captives at Anomabu on 1 September. She sailed from Africa on 1 April 1793 and arrived at St Vincent on 8 May. She had embarked 340 captives, of whom only two died, for a loss rate of 0.6%. She had a crew of 37, of whom four died. Iris arrived back at Liverpool on 30 June.

Lloyd's Register for 1795 showed that Iris was almost rebuilt in 1794. It also showed her master changing from Huson to Salisbury, and her trade from Liverpool–Africa to Liverpool–Bengal.

EIC voyage (1795-1796): Captain John B. Salisbury acquired a letter of marque on 20 August 1795. He sailed from Liverpool on 13 September 1795, bound for Bengal. Iris arrived at Calcutta on 23 February 1796. On her homeward leg she reached St Helena on 14 July and arrived at The Downs on 4 November.

Enslaving voyage #6 (1797-1798): Captain John Spencer acquired a letter of marque on 29 March 1797. He sailed from Liverpool on 23 April 1797, bound for West Central Africa and St Helena (i.e., present day Angola). Iris arrived at Jamaica on 2 November. She had embarked 419 captives and disembarked 405, for a loss rate of 3.3%. She had 35 crew members, of whom 2 died. Iris left Jamaica on 13 January 1798 and arrived back at Liverpool on 3 March.

Enslaving voyage #7 (1797-1798): Captain Spencer sailed from Liverpool on 8 June 1798, bound for the Bight of Biafra. Spencer drowned at Bonny on 20 or 30 August. His first mate, George Cannon took over command. Iris gathered her captives at Bonny and arrived at Kingston, Jamaica, on 4 November. She had embarked 452 captives and disembarked 414. Iris sailed from Jamaica on 12 February 1799 and arrived at Liverpool on 12 April. She had left Liverpool with a crew of 40 men; nine crew members died on the voyage.

Enslaving voyage #7 (1799-1800): Captain George Cannon acquired a letter of marque on 17 June 1799. He sailed from Liverpool on 5 July 1799. Iris arrived at Jamaica on 6 August 1800. She had embarked 447 captives and she disembarked 409, for a loss rate of 8.5%. She had 44 crewmen, 10 of whom died on the voyage.

Fate
Iris departed Kingston. After leaving port she encountered bad weather. On 12 December Lloyd's List reported that Iris, "Cannell", master, had put back into Kingston leaky. Iris was condemned there as unseaworthy.

Notes

Citations

References
 
 
 
 

1783 ships
Age of Sail merchant ships of England
Liverpool slave ships
Ships of the British East India Company
Maritime incidents in 1800